Milners of Leyburn, also known as C Milner & Sons, is a small family run department store in the market town of Leyburn, Wensleydale, North Yorkshire, England. The shop sells women's fashions, accessories, nightwear and bedding on the ground floor and has a 'Last Chance to Buy' basement. Milners Interiors, (on the first floor)provides a made to measure service in curtains, blinds and shutters and a selection of carpets and range of flooring. 

The business was started in 1882 by Christopher Milner, hence the C in the name, with a shop in Hawes, and is now in its fifth generation in the family following the retirement of David Milner in March 2008.

The BBC made a television documentary series of three programmes, entitled 'The Department Store'. Produced by Richard Macer, it was about independent department stores and how they are surviving in the modern world in the face of stiff competition from chain stores. The first programme in the series, on Milners, was filmed by the BBC from September 2007 to April 2008. It was initially shown on BBC Four on 17 November 2008 and subsequently on BBC Two on 7 April 2009.

David Milner, who was featured in the programme, has retired and even assisted with a charity expedition to the Gambia in January 2010. His daughter, Leonie, with her husband, Keith Garrard, are now Managing Directors of the store which continues to trade after 130 years of serving the Dales.

References

External links 
 

Department stores of the United Kingdom
Companies established in 1882
Leyburn
Companies based in Richmondshire